Rombauer may refer to:

 Rombauer (horse), a Thoroughbred racehorse that won the 2021 Preakness Stakes
 Rombauer, Missouri, an unincorporated community in the United States
 Irma S. Rombauer (1877–1962), an American cookbook author who wrote The Joy of Cooking
 Johann Rombauer (1782–1849), a Hungarian portrait painter